Xie Daoyun (謝道韞, before 340-after 399) was a Chinese poet, writer, scholar, calligrapher and debater of the Eastern Jin Dynasty.

Family
Born in Yangxia County, Henan, Daoyun belonged to the Xie clan and was a sister of the general Xie Xuan. Though her mother is unknown, it is known that she gave birth to five more children. She was also the favourite niece of prime-minister Xie An. There were Daoist and Confucianist influences in her work.

Life

Her uncle Xie An enjoyed spending time with his nieces and nephews and would quiz them on literature and philosophy. She outperformed her siblings and cousins during the tests her uncle set. Later, she would defend her uncle against the criticism of Huan Xuan.

She married Wang Ningzhi, son of a famous calligrapher. Despite being displeased with him, they still had several children together. The Wang family had debates at their house and she was undefeated at those.

Xie Daoyun and her children accompanied Wang Ningzhi to Jiangzhou, when he became a regional inspector. When Sun En led a rebellion, Wang promised divine intervention. Since none came, he and their sons were killed by rebels. Xie Daoyun and her maids then went to meet the rebels. She is said to have killed several before being taken prisoner. When the rebel leader Sun En planned to kill her grandson as well, she told him to kill her first. After this, he spared the boy's life.

Xie Daoyun returned to Kuaiji and lived out her days in the Wang household.

Legacy

The Book of Jin has a biography of her. This book states that her work was popular with her contemporaries. She was seen as a symbol of female talent during her time and during later dynasties. The Three Character Classic tells her story and a Ming Dynasty musical composition is about the gatherings of Xie Daoyun and Xie An.

References

Bibliography 
 

Chinese women writers
Chinese women philosophers
Women in war in China
Women in ancient Chinese warfare
4th-century Chinese women
4th-century Chinese people
4th-century Chinese women writers
4th-century Chinese writers
4th-century Chinese philosophers
Women in 4th-century warfare
Jin dynasty (266–420) philosophers
Jin dynasty (266–420) writers
Year of birth uncertain